"I Can Take or Leave Your Loving" is a song written by Tony Macaulay and John Macleod which was written for and originally recorded by The Foundations and it was issued as the B side of their 1968 release "Back on My Feet Again".. It was heard on the radio by Mickie Most who recognised its A side potential and quickly cut it with Herman's Hermits (although only Peter Noone from the group appeared on the record.)

Chart performance
It reached No. 1 in Canada, #11 in United Kingdom, #19 in New Zealand, #22 in the United States, and #37 in Australia in 1968.

References

1967 songs
1967 singles
Herman's Hermits songs
The Foundations songs
Song recordings produced by Mickie Most
RPM Top Singles number-one singles
MGM Records singles